Kerry Muzzey (born 1970) is an American classical composer.

Early life 
Muzzey was born and raised in Joliet, Illinois. Muzzey graduated from Millikin University in Decatur, Illinois, with a degree in piano performance.

Career 
In 2007, he was commissioned by director Bill Purple and Iron Ocean Films' executive producers Jessica Biel and Michelle Purple to create the score for Iron Ocean Films' first film, Hole in the Paper Sky. In that same year he also lent several instrumental compositions to the Robert Redford– and Terrence Malick–produced documentary, The Unforeseen. Muzzey also scored the film Amexicano.

In 2009, Kerry Muzzey was approached by the music supervisor of Glee about using Muzzey's composition "Looking Back" as a love theme in the first two episodes of the series. The music was well received and was used in multiple episodes of the series. In 2011, Muzzey was commissioned to score the Wendie Malick film What Happens Next, followed by Holiday Engagement.

Kerry Muzzey's contemporary classical music has been featured on So You Think You Can Dance, for which Muzzey created a custom version of his composition "Bernini's Angels" In 2012, choreographer Christopher Scott used Muzzey's composition "Architect of the Mind" as the opening number for the show's Top 20 dancers. In 2012 Kerry again collaborated with choreographer Christopher Scott and director Jon M. Chu to compose the music for "Earth Chorus," a composition that used NASA recordings of the Earth's sounds as heard from space and turned them into musical instruments. The video was performed by The Legion of Extraordinary Dancers and was featured on Mashable.

In August 2014, Muzzey released the album The Architect, which was recorded at AIR Lyndhurst by the Chamber Orchestra of London. The album debuted at #5 on the iTunes Classical Chart and simultaneously debuted at #5 on the Billboard Classical Chart. The album also spent three months in featured placement on the iTunes Classical storefront. In 2015, Muzzey scored the documentary film The Seer (later retitled Look & See: A Portrait of Wendell Berry)

In 2017, Muzzey was commissioned to create the original score for Northern Ballet's full length ballet, Casanova, which premiered in London at Sadler's Wells. 

Kerry Muzzey resides in Los Angeles.

References 

Living people
American male classical composers
American classical composers
20th-century classical composers
21st-century classical composers
American television composers
1970 births
American film score composers
Musicians from Los Angeles
21st-century American composers
20th-century American composers
Classical musicians from California
American male film score composers
20th-century American male musicians
21st-century American male musicians